William Douglas "Willie" Marshall (9 July 1884 – 17 May 1971) was an Australian rules footballer who played with Melbourne and University in the Victorian Football League (VFL).

Marshall was born in Scotland, the son of Presbyterian minister Alexander Marshall. The family emigrated to Australia in 1888, and William Marshall completed his schooling at Scotch College, Melbourne. Marshall played VFL football while studying to become a minister. In 1921 he married Josephine Taylor and he served as the Presbyterian minister in Sale for many years. After moving back to Melbourne he was appointed moderator of the Presbyterian Church of Victoria.

References

Holmesby, Russell & Main, Jim (2007). The Encyclopedia of AFL Footballers. 7th ed. Melbourne: Bas Publishing.

External links

Willie Marshall at Demonwiki

1884 births
1971 deaths
People educated at Scotch College, Melbourne
University of Melbourne alumni sportspeople
VFL/AFL players born outside Australia
University Football Club players
Melbourne Football Club players
Scottish emigrants to Australia
Scottish players of Australian rules football
Australian Presbyterian ministers
20th-century Australian clergy